Yoshirō, Yoshiro or Yoshirou is a masculine Japanese given name.

Possible writings
Yoshirō can be written using different combinations of kanji characters. Here are some examples: 

義郎, "justice, son"
義朗, "justice, clear"
吉郎, "good luck, son"
吉朗, "good luck, clear"
善郎, "virtuous, son"
善朗, "virtuous, clear"
芳郎, "fragrant/virtuous, son"
芳朗, "fragrant/virtuous, clear"
好郎, "good/like something, son"
喜郎, "rejoice, son"
喜朗, "rejoice, clear"
慶郎, "congratulate, son"
嘉郎, "excellent, son"
嘉朗, "excellent, clear"
与志郎, "give, determination, son"
与四郎, "give, 4, son"

The name can also be written in hiragana よしろう or katakana ヨシロウ.

Notable people with the name

, Japanese footballer
, Japanese high jumper
, Japanese golfer
, Japanese politician
, Japanese composer
, Japanese anime producer
, Japanese mixed martial artist
, Japanese politician
, Japanese footballer
, Japanese costume designer and art director
, Japanese playwright and writer
, Japanese inventor
, Japanese footballer
, Japanese swimmer
, Japanese engineer
, Japanese politician
, Japanese sumo wrestler
, Japanese long jumper
, Japanese architect
, Japanese politician
, a member of the Japanese band Funkist

Japanese masculine given names